Kim Woo-hong (born 11 January 1995) is a South Korean footballer who plays as a winger for Busan Transportation Corporation FC.

Club career

FC Seoul
Kim Woo-hong joined FC Seoul on 7 January 2018. He made his K League 1 debut on 1 September 2018 against Gangwon FC.

References

External links 
 
 Kim Woo-hong Profile

1995 births
Living people
People from Yeongju
South Korean footballers
Association football wingers
UD Almería B players
Deportivo Fabril players
FC Seoul players
FC Namdong players
Segunda División B players
Tercera División players
K League 1 players
K4 League players
South Korea under-17 international footballers
South Korean expatriate footballers
Expatriate footballers in Spain
South Korean expatriate sportspeople in Spain
Sportspeople from North Gyeongsang Province